Ko Hye-in (born 18 July 1994) is a South Korean ice hockey player.

Career
She competed in the 2018 Winter Olympics as part of a unified team of 35 players drawn from both North and South Korea. The team's coach was Sarah Murray and the team was in Group B competing against Switzerland, Japan and Sweden.

References

1994 births
Living people
Ice hockey players at the 2018 Winter Olympics
Olympic ice hockey players of South Korea
South Korean women's ice hockey forwards
Winter Olympics competitors for Korea
Ice hockey players at the 2007 Asian Winter Games
Ice hockey players at the 2011 Asian Winter Games
Ice hockey players at the 2017 Asian Winter Games